Single of the Year may refer to:

ARIA Award for Single of the Year
Juno Award for Single of the Year
NME Single of the Year

See also
Song of the Year (disambiguation)